Raymond Craigmile Thompson (born 1942)  was Dean of Clogher from 2005  until 2009.

He was educated at the University of Manchester and ordained in 1985. After  a curacy in Clooney  he held  incumbencies at Urney  and Derryvullen North  until his time as Dean.

References

Irish Anglicans
1942 births
Alumni of the University of Manchester
Deans of Clogher
Living people